Estonian Air Sports Federation (abbreviation EASF) is one of the sport governing bodies in Estonia which deals with air sports.

EASF is a member of World Air Sports Federation (FAI) and a member of Estonian Olympic Committee.

References

External links
 

Sports governing bodies in Estonia
Aviation in Estonia
Fédération Aéronautique Internationale
Air sports